Conroe Normal and Industrial College served African Americans in Conroe, Texas.

Dr. Jimmie Johnson fundraised for the school and served as its president. He and his wife were among the small number of early teachers at the school after it was founded in 1903. David Abner Jr. took over as president. Dr. William A. Johnson also served as president.  

It was on 10th Street. Its five-story main building burned in 1915 and a new two-story building constructed for it. Boys and girls were taught at the school and were kept separated. They wore uniforms.

UTSA Libraries has a 1947 photograph of Baptist ministers in front of the school. It eventually became Conroe Baptist Theological Institute. 

TCU Libraries have a collection of photographs, interviews, and documents about the school. In 2021 plans were announced to restore the remaining college building and property as a community center.

See also
Guadalupe College

References

See also
David Abner Jr.

Historically black universities and colleges in the United States
Conroe, Texas